Universal Monsters Live Rock and Roll Show (previously known as Beetlejuice's Graveyard Mash-Up, Beetlejuice's Graveyard Revue, Beetlejuice's Rock and Roll Graveyard Revue, and Beetlejuice's Rockin' Graveyard Revue) is a live musical revue stage show based on the film of the same name and Universal's Classic Monsters. It is located at Universal Studios Japan, and formerly played at Universal Studios Hollywood and Universal Studios Florida.

The show closed in Hollywood in 1999, replaced by Spider-Man Rocks, and the show closed in Florida in 2016 to make way for Fast & Furious: Supercharged.

History

The attraction opened at both Universal Studios Florida and Universal Studios Hollywood in 1992. The Florida venue replaced An American Tail Theatre, and the Hollywood version opened on an outdoor stage near the current site of "Super Silly Fun Land".

The venue at Universal Studios Florida was refurbished in 1993 with additional seats and a roof to block the sun.

The show at Universal Studios Hollywood was revamped and moved indoors in 1995, replacing The Adventures of Conan: A Sword and Sorcery Spectacular in the Castle Theater. It played there until 1999, when it was replaced by Spider-Man Rocks.

In 2001, Universal Studios Japan debuted a version the show, titled Universal Monsters Live Rock and Roll Show, based on the 1995 Hollywood version. It plays in the Hollywood section of the park.

In 2002, Universal Studios Florida modified their show to be more like the 1995 Hollywood and 2001 Japan versions. They revamped the show several more times between 2002 and 2016, changing songs, costumes, and characters. A revamp in 2014 changed the name of the show to Beetlejuice's Graveyard Mash-Up. On November 7, 2015, Universal announced that the show would be permanently closed. It was originally set to close on December 3, but this would be delayed to January 5, 2016. The site of the theater became Fast & Furious: Supercharged in 2018.

Halloween Horror Nights
The stage for Beetlejuice at Universal Studios Florida has been used to house shows at the park's Halloween Horror Nights. It has been used to make the following shows thus far.

The Rocky Horror Picture Show: A Tribute (HHN Carnival of Carnage, Reflections of Fear & Ripped from the Silver Screen)
Brian Brushwood: Menace and Malice (HHN Twenty Years of Fear)
20 Penny Circus: (HHN 22)

Summary

Original Version

The show begins once everyone is seated. A mummified Beetlejuice opens up his coffin on the stage to tell the guests that he is "wrapped up", so he wants the guests to say his name three times. He closes the lid, and then fireworks burst from the top of it and Beetlejuice, in his striped suit, emerges from it. He goes on to mingle with guests and tell them what he has in store for them. Beetlejuice (here referred to as "BJ") looks for a park guest to join the show, and the Universal Monsters, The Phantom of the Opera, Dracula, Frankenstein's monster, Wolfman and Bride of Frankenstein, then appear out of doors and corridors from the stage, and BJ directs guests to say his name three times, and the Universal Monsters are transformed into rock stars. The show continues through various other songs and dances with each monster singing their own song. At the end of the show, BJ has park guests cheer for all of the monsters, especially himself.

Version 2.0

The show begins once everyone is seated. The Mummy opens up his coffin on the stage and dances. He closes the lid, fireworks burst from the top, and Beetlejuice emerges from it. BJ goes on to mingle with guests and tell them what he has in store for them. The Universal Monsters, Dracula, The Frankenstein Monster, Wolfman and Bride of Frankenstein, then appear out of doors and corridors from the stage to sing. BJ then directs guests to say his name three times, and he transforms the Universal Monsters into rock stars. After the first musical segment, BJ introduces his "fab on the slab" "back-up babes," Hip and Hop. The show continues as each Monster sings his/her own song, with Hip and Hop providing vocal/dance back-up. At the end of the show, each character takes a bow and the audience applauds.

Version 3.0

The show begins once everyone is seated. The Mummy opens up his coffin on the stage to tell the guests their safety precautions. He closes the lid, and then fireworks burst from the top of it and Beetlejuice emerges from it. He goes on to mingle with guests and tell them what he has in store for them, including Paris Hilton live on stage, to which Igor is heard from backstage telling him that she is "unavailable". Beetlejuice (here referred to as "BJ") looks for a park guest to take her place, and the Universal Monsters, Dracula, The Frankenstein Monster, Wolfman and Bride of Frankenstein, then appear out of doors and corridors from the stage, and BJ directs guests to say his name three times, and the Universal Monsters are transformed into rock stars. After the first musical segment, BJ introduces Translyvania's resident Ghoul Girl Cheerleaders, Hip and Hop. The show continues as each Monster sings his/her own song, with Hip and Hop providing vocal/dance back-up. At the end of the show, each character takes a bow and the audience applauds.

Version 4.0

The show begins once everyone is seated. Igor tells the guests about the show. Beetlejuice comes out and sees the guests and tells them that he is not ready yet. He then interacts with the guests. Once he comes back to the backstage, four ghosts arrive and dance, then the Universal Monsters: Dracula, The Frankenstein Monster, Wolfman and Bride of Frankenstein, appear out of doors and corridors from the stage to sing and dance. Beetlejuice's disembodied voice directs guests to say his name three times, then he arrives on stage. After the first musical segment, Beetlejuice introduces The Phantom of the Opera's daughter Phantasia, and the Egyptian queen, Cleopatra. The show continues as each Monster sings his/her own song, with Phantasia and Cleopatra providing vocal/dance back-up. At the end of the show, Beetlejuice asks his guests to say his name three times and once they do he disappears. The other monsters leave the way they came on as the audience applauds.

Set list

Original version: 1992–2002 (Florida) and 1991–1995 (Hollywood) 

BJ's Entrance Music: Main Titles from Beetlejuice by Danny Elfman
1. Wild Things - All
2. Wolfman's Rap/Thank You Falettin' Me Be Mice Elf Agin - Wolfman and Company
3. Great Balls of Fire - Phantom of the Opera
4. You Make Me Feel Like a Natural Woman - Bride of Frankenstein
5. Hot Blooded - Frankenstein's Monster
6. In The Midnight Hour - Dracula
7. Mashup: (You Make Me Feel Like A) Natural Woman/Hot Blooded/In The Midnight Hour - Bride of Frankenstein/Frankenstein's Monster/Dracula
8. When A Man Loves a Woman - Frankenstein's Monster
9. Higher and Higher - Frankenstein's Monster/Bride of Frankenstein/All
10. Day-O (Banana Boat Song)/Jump In The Line - All

Version 2.0: 1995–1999 (Hollywood), 2002–2006 (Florida) and 2001–Present (Japan) 

BJ's Entrance Music: "We Will Rock You" by Queen
1. Rockin' the Paradise/Rock N Roll All Nite - All (all three parks)
2. I Wanna Rock/One Wild Night - Wolfman and Company (Florida, Japan); Knock On Wood/Do You Love Me?- Wolfman and company (Hollywood)
3. I Will Survive—Bride of Frankenstein (with Frank's Monster, Drac, and Wolfman) (all three parks)
4. YMCA - BJ (Florida, Japan); Great Balls of Fire- Phantom of the Opera and company (Hollywood)
5. Hot Stuff - Hip and Hop (Florida, Japan); Addicted to Love/Hot Blooded/In The Midnight Hour- Dracula, Bride of Frankenstein, Frankenstein's Monster and company (Hollywood)
6. It's Raining Men - All (Florida, Japan)
7. Smooth - Frankenstein's Monster (Florida, Japan); When a Man Loves a Woman- Frankenstein's Monster (Hollywood)
8. Livin' La Vida Loca - Dracula (Florida, Japan); Higher- all (Hollywood)
9. Finale (Rock N Roll All Nite) - All (all three parks)

"Day-O (The Banana Boat Song)" was reinstated to the Hollywood version during the final day of showing.

Version 3.0: 2006–2014 (Florida) 

BJ's Entrance Music: Main Titles from Beetlejuice by Danny Elfman
1. Let's Get it Started - All
2. Hey Mickey/Superfreak - Hip and Hop
3. Jump! - Wolfman
4. I Will Survive - Bride of Frankenstein
5. Dancing in the Dark - Frankenstein's Monster
6. Frankie's Girl - Dracula
7. You Give Love a Bad Name - All
8. Hey Ya - Hip and Hop
9. It's Raining Men/Holding Out for a Hero - Hip and Hop, Bride of Frankenstein.
10. You Shook Me All Night Long - All
11. Finale (You Shook Me All Night Long) - All

Version 4.0: 2014–2016 (Florida) 

1. Let's Go Crazy - All
2. Sweet Dreams (Are Made Of This) - Phantasia
Preceded by a snippet of Jump in the Line
3. Walk Like An Egyptian/Cleo's Rap - Cleopatra
4. Girls Just Wanna Have Fun - Cleopatra, Phantasia, Bride of Frankenstein
Contains an interpolation of Atomic Dog
5. Doctor Feelgood/Welcome to the Jungle Mashup - Wolfman, Frankenstein's Monster, and the Girls
6. Feed My Frankenstein - Frankenstein's Monster and the Company
7. BJ's Random Possession Mix (The Good, The Bad, and the Ugly/The Fox/Thriller/Uptown Funk/Watch Me (Whip/Nae Nae)) - Company
8. What I Like About You/You Really Got Me Mashup - Company
9. Smooth Criminal/Sweet Dreams Mashup - Phantasia and Dracula
10. Ballroom Blitz/Let's Go Crazy Mashup - Company

For the final shows on the final day, instead of concluding the possession mix with Watch Me (Whip/Nae Nae), it was concluded with Day O (Banana Boat Song). In addition rather than using the Misfits' cover of Monster Mash, the exit theme was "Bye, Bye, Bye" by N'Sync which is a likely reference to Joey Fatone who performed as the Wolfman in the 90's

USJ 20th Anniversary Cast

Beetlejuice - Shunsaku Sato, Keisuke Uchikiba, Takuya Hinase, Taka San

Bride - Kendra Thomas, Lauren Anselm, Bekka Coleman

Frankenstein - Joel Roberts, Daniel Olson, Roy Nichols III

Dracula - James Kemp, Jarrod Moore, Declan Wheeldon, Brian O’Gibney

Wolfie - Chris Shanko, Richard Lim, Cameron Davey, Brian O’Gibney

Hip - Gemma Marshall, Nadia Jane, Lindsie Johnson, Chloe Finlay

Hop - Lucy Shepherd, Tiarna Johnson, Micaela Gorman, Leisl Smibert

See also
Beetlejuice
Universal Monsters

References

External links
Universal Monsters Live Rock and Roll Show at Universal Studios Japan

Amusement park attractions introduced in 1992
Amusement park attractions that closed in 1999
Amusement park attractions that closed in 2016
Universal Studios Hollywood
Universal Studios Florida
Universal Parks & Resorts attractions by name
Licensed properties at Universal Parks & Resorts
Amusement park attractions based on film franchises
Former Universal Studios Hollywood attractions
Beetlejuice
Universal Monsters